Andrew Reid was a Scottish professional footballer who played as a full back. He played a total of twelve games in the Football League for Burnley and Bradford Park Avenue.

References

Footballers from Aberdeen
Scottish footballers
Association football fullbacks
Burnley F.C. players
Bradford (Park Avenue) A.F.C. players
Reading F.C. players
English Football League players
Year of death missing
Year of birth missing
Bo'ness F.C. players
Burton Town F.C. players